Carp Lake Provincial Park is a provincial park in British Columbia, Canada, located 2 hours northwest of Prince George between the Muskeg and McLeod Rivers, to the southwest of the community of McLeod Lake, which is 32 km from the park's campground.

External links
BC Parks webpage

Provincial parks of British Columbia
Central Interior of British Columbia
Lakes of British Columbia
1973 establishments in British Columbia
Cariboo Land District